Đorđe Majtan (also transliterated Djordje; born 1 January 1939 in Novi Sad) is a retired Serbian high jumper who represented SFR Yugoslavia at the 1960 Summer Olympics and won 26th place. He was a member of the Athletics Club Red Star Belgrade.

External links 
 
 

1939 births
Living people
Serbian male high jumpers
Athletes (track and field) at the 1960 Summer Olympics
Olympic athletes of Yugoslavia
Sportspeople from Novi Sad
Yugoslav male high jumpers